Karut; is an abandoned village in the Kajaran Municipality of Syunik Province of Armenia.

Demographics 
600 people lived in the village in 1987. Statistical Committee of Armenia reported it as unpopulated at the 2011 census, down from 8 at the 2001 census.

References

Former populated places in Syunik Province